1,6-Dichloro-1,6-dideoxyfructose (dichlorodideoxyfructose) is chlorinated derivative of the sugar fructose. It is one of the two components believed to comprise the disaccharide sucralose, a commercial sugar substitute.

Metabolism 
In mammals, 1,6-dichloro-1,6-dideoxyfructose is metabolized in the liver and erythrocytes by a reaction with glutathione that replaces one of the chlorine atoms, forming 6-chlorofructos-1-yl glutathione (or chlorofructosyl glutathione).

References

Organochlorides